San Michele Arcangelo is a romanesque-style Roman Catholic church in the city of Potenza, region of Basilicata, Italy.

History
A church at the site is first documented in 1178, however, floor mosaics, likely from the 5th century, uncovered in the church suggest that a late Roman structure was likely here before then.  As was common for many Lombard churches, it was dedicated to St Michael Archangel. The stone portal has a sculpted relief of the Madonna and Child with some Franciscan Order symbols.

Gallery

References

Roman Catholic churches in Potenza
Romanesque architecture in Basilicata
12th-century Roman Catholic church buildings in Italy